The Journal of Medical Physics is a quarterly peer-reviewed open access medical journal published on behalf of the Association of Medical Physicists of India by Medknow Publications. It was established in 1976 as the AMPI Medical Physics Bulletin and obtained its current name in 1996. It covers research in nuclear medicine.

Abstracting and indexing 
The journal is abstracted and indexed in:

External links 
 

Open access journals
Medknow Publications academic journals
Quarterly journals
English-language journals
Medical physics journals
Publications established in 1976